Vitor Benedito Leque da Silva (born 19 January 2001), known as Vitor Leque, is a Brazilian footballer who plays as forward for Juventude, on loan from Cruzeiro .

Club career
Born in Cuiabá, Mato Grosso, Vitor Leque joined Atlético Goianiense's youth setup in 2020, after representing Internacional, São Luís-GO and Betis. He made his first team debut on 8 March of that year, coming on as a second-half substitute for Matheus Vargas in a 1–0 Campeonato Goiano away win against Goiânia.

In 2020, Vitor Leque renewed his contract until 2025. He made his Série A debut on 20 January 2021, replacing Wellington Rato and scoring his team's third in a 3–1 away win over Botafogo.

On 23 March 2021, Vitor Leque joined Cruzeiro on loan until the end of the year, initially for the under-20 squad.

Career statistics

Honours
Atlético Goianiense
 Campeonato Goiano: 2020

Cruzeiro
 Campeonato Brasileiro Série B: 2022

References

External links
Futebol de Goyaz profile 

2001 births
Living people
People from Cuiabá
Brazilian footballers
Association football forwards
Campeonato Brasileiro Série A players
Campeonato Brasileiro Série B players
Atlético Clube Goianiense players
Cruzeiro Esporte Clube players
Sportspeople from Mato Grosso